Nine Mile Prairie (named for its location  west and  north of downtown Lincoln) is a  tract of conserved tallgrass prairie in Lancaster County, Nebraska, United States. Except for one small portion of it that was farmed as recently as the 1950s, Nine-Mile Prairie has never been plowed (some of the land has at times been grazed as recently as the 1960s).  As such, it is one of the largest areas of virgin tallgrass prairie in the state of Nebraska.  A 228-acre portion has been listed on the National Register of Historic Places, as Nine-Mile Prairie, since 1986.

The area was previously owned by the Department of Defense and served as part of a fenced buffer zone around a World War II era bomb storage depot.  It was later sold to the City of Lincoln, then from 1966 on managed by the Lincoln Airport Authority, then in 1983 transferred to the University Foundation.

Nine Mile Prairie is now administered by the University of Nebraska–Lincoln. The university uses it for a variety of research and recreational purposes, especially for studies of prairie ecology. Research on this prairie began in the 1920s when Professor John Ernest Weaver and his students started using it for their studies of prairie plant ecology.

In addition to prairie grasses, some of which including big bluestem (Andropogon gerardii) can grow as tall as six feet, the site supports a range of prairie trees, including cottonwoods and honey locust. Invasive sumac plants and (in the absence of fire) eastern juniper trees require control to preserve the original prairie ecology. A total of 392 species of vascular plants and 80 species of birds have been observed at Nine Mile Prairie. Notable species include the federally threatened prairie white fringed orchid (Platanthera praeclara) and the rare regal fritillary butterfly (Speyeria idalia), and it is home to bluebirds and white-tailed deer; herds of bison would have also passed through the site when it was open prairie until the mid-19th century.

References

External links 
 University of Nebraska site on Nine Mile Prairie
 

Protected areas of Lancaster County, Nebraska
Landforms of Nebraska
Prairies
Nature reserves in Nebraska
University of Nebraska–Lincoln
Natural features on the National Register of Historic Places in Nebraska
National Register of Historic Places in Lancaster County, Nebraska